Tracie Nicole Thoms is an Emmy-nominated American television, film, and stage actress and singer. She is known for her roles in Rent, Cold Case, The Devil Wears Prada, Death Proof, and the short-lived Fox television series Wonderfalls.

Early life and education
Thoms was born and raised in Baltimore, Maryland, daughter of Donald H. Thoms, a VP of Programming at PBS and television director, and wife Mariana Davis. She has a younger brother, Austin. She started studying acting at age ten and later on attended the Baltimore School for the Arts. 

She earned her Bachelor of Fine Arts degree from Howard University in 1997. She then attended the Juilliard School's Drama Division as a member of Group 30 (1997–2001), which also included actors Lee Pace and Anthony Mackie.

Career
Thoms is known for her role of Mahandra McGinty in the television show Wonderfalls. She also played the part of Sasha in the US version of the T.V. series As If, which was cancelled after three episodes. In 2005, she was added to the cast of the CBS crime drama Cold Case, as the homicide detective, Kat Miller. Thoms has also made guest appearances on Law & Order and The Shield.

Thoms has appeared in several movies, most notably in the film adaptation of the Broadway musical Rent in which she plays Joanne Jefferson, lawyer and lover of Maureen Johnson (Idina Menzel). She took over the role from Fredi Walker, who played Joanne in the original Broadway production of Rent but, at age 43, was deemed too old to reprise the role. Prior to being cast as Joanne, Thoms had considered herself a fan of the show, having seen it on Broadway several times.

She was featured in the 2002 Comedy Central film Porn 'n Chicken and the 2004 films Brother to Brother and The Warrior Class. Thoms appeared in the 2006 film version of The Devil Wears Prada as Lily. Thoms has completed filming on the City Lights Pictures movie Descent along with Rent co-stars Wilson Jermaine Heredia and Rosario Dawson and will soon begin filming Jimmie with co-stars Vanessa Williams and Brian McKnight. She appeared in Quentin Tarantino's Death Proof, alongside Zoë Bell, Rosario Dawson and Mary Elizabeth Winstead.

Thoms made her Broadway debut in Regina Taylor's Drowning Crow. She has also appeared in several off-Broadway and regional productions, including Up Against the Wind (New York Theatre Workshop), The Oedipus Plays (The Shakespeare Theater), A Raisin in the Sun (Baltimore CenterStage) Joe Turner's Come and Gone (Missouri Rep), The Exonerated (Off Broadway's The Culture Project) and The Antigone Project (The Women's Project). On July 18, 2008, she joined the final cast of Rent starting July 26, 2008, reprising the character of Joanne, replacing Merle Dandridge. The final performance was made into a DVD: Rent: Filmed Live on Broadway.

Thoms reprised her role as Joanne for another production of Rent, directed by Neil Patrick Harris, at the Hollywood Bowl from August 6–8, 2010.

In the fall of 2010 she appeared in the concert revue For The Record: Quentin Tarantino in Los Angeles, presented by ROCKLA for Show at Barre. It ran from August 12, 2010, to October 30, 2010, and also starred Jenna Leigh Green, Autumn Reeser, Ty Taylor, and Audra Mae. From November 2010 through January 2011, Thoms starred in Show at Barre's  For The Record: John Hughes, alongside Barrett Foa, Von Smith and Ty Taylor. In 2011 she appeared at Show at Barre in the revue For the Record: Baz Luhrmann, from February 12, 2011, to June 30, 2011, with Jenna Leigh Green, Arielle Jacobs, Tinuke Oyefule and Kate Reinders.

She played Etta, Diana Prince's personal assistant, in NBC's Wonder Woman pilot.

Thoms had a role in the 2014 version of Annie, playing Annie's "fake mother", a character based on Lily St. Regis in the original musical.

In 2016, she appeared in the Broadway Tony-nominated revival of Falsettos as Dr. Charlotte.

Awards 
In 2016, Thoms was Emmy nominated in the Outstanding Actress In A Short Form Comedy Or Drama Series category for "Send Me: An Original Web Series" which was released on BET.com.

Filmography

Film and TV Movies

Television

Radio

Theatre

References

External links
  Tracie Thoms Bio at CBS TV's Cold Case
 
 
 Official RENT Blog – Includes video blogs and short interviews with the RENT cast

Living people
21st-century American actresses
Actresses from Baltimore
African-American actresses
20th-century African-American women singers
Alumni of the British American Drama Academy
American film actresses
American musical theatre actresses
American television actresses
Howard University alumni
Juilliard School alumni
21st-century African-American women
21st-century African-American people
Year of birth missing (living people)